Sparks Fly may refer to:

Music 
 Sparks Fly (album), a 2010 album by Miranda Cosgrove
 "Sparks Fly" (song), a 2011 song by Taylor Swift
 "Sparks Fly", a song by Daníel Ágúst Haraldsson from the Fálkar soundtrack album
 "Sparks Fly", a song by David Crowder Band from Illuminate
 "Sparks Fly", a song by Tiffany Giardina from No Average Angel
 "Sparks Fly", a song by Widespread Panic from Ball

Television 
 "Sparks Fly", an episode of Million Dollar Listing Los Angeles
 "Sparks Fly", an episode of Astro Farm
 "Sparks Fly", an episode of Hart of Dixie

Literature 
 Sparks Fly, a 1948 children's novel by Helen O'Clery
 Sparks Fly, a 2012 novel in the Light Dragons series by Katie MacAlister